The Roman Catholic Diocese of Jujuy is in the city of San Salvador de Jujuy, Argentina and is a suffragan of the Archdiocese of Salta.

History
On 20 April 1934, Pope Pius XI established the Diocese of Jujuy from the Diocese of Salta.  It lost territory to the Territorial Prelature of Humahuaca when it was created in 1969.

Bishops

Ordinaries
Enrique José Mühn, S.V.D. (1934–1965)
José Miguel Medina (1965–1983)
Raúl Arsenio Casado (1983–1994)
Marcelino Palentini, S.C.I. (1995–2011)
César Daniel Fernández (since 2012)

Coadjutor bishop
Agustín Adolfo Herrera (1961-1965), did not succeed to see; appointed Bishop of San Francisco

Territorial losses

References

Roman Catholic dioceses in Argentina
Roman Catholic Ecclesiastical Province of Salta
Christian organizations established in 1934
Roman Catholic dioceses and prelatures established in the 20th century